Leptobryum pyriforme is a species of moss belonging to the family Bryaceae.

It has cosmopolitan distribution.

Leptobryum pyriforme is known to be able to use artificial light to grow in places which are otherwise devoid of natural light, such as Crystal Cave in Wisconsin.

References

Bryaceae